Rear-Admiral Rafe Grenville Rowley-Conwy, CMG (11 September 1875 – 4 April 1951), was a Royal Navy officer and Lord Lieutenant of Flintshire.

Biography
Rowley-Conwy was the second son of Captain Conwy Granville Hercules Rowley (1841-1900), by his wife Marian Harford. His father, who later took the surname Rowley-Conwy, was a son of Colonel the Hon. Richard Rowley (1812-1887), an MP for Harwich and a younger son of the 1st Baron Langford.

He was confirmed as a second lieutenant in the Royal Navy on 14 December 1894, and later promoted to Lieutenant. On 13 May 1902 he was appointed to the cruiser HMS Medusa, as First and Gunnery lieutenant. He was promoted to Commander on 22 July 1911, and to Captain on 31 December 1916. In November 1914 he was appointed in command of the destroyer HMS Mentor. He was in command of the 15th Destroyer Flotilla from November, 1917 to 1 March 1919. Appointed Captain (D), 3rd Destroyer Flotilla from 7 July 1919 to 7 July 1921.  During the latter part of the First World War, and was appointed captain of the light cruiser HMS Curacoa in 1921. He retired as Rear-Admiral.

Rowley-Conwy was High Sheriff of Flintshire in 1929, and was appointed Lord Lieutenant of Flintshire on 3 July 1935, serving as such until his death in April 1951.

Rowley-Conwy owned the Bodrhyddan estate in Rhuddlan. He never married, and the estate was inherited by his nephew Geoffrey Alexander Rowley-Conwy, who later succeeded a second cousin as Baron Langford.

References

External links 
 Bodrhyddan Hall website

1875 births
1951 deaths
Royal Navy admirals
High Sheriffs of Flintshire
Lord-Lieutenants of Flintshire